Prairieville may refer to a place in the United States:

 Prairieville, Alabama, an unincorporated community
 Prairieville, Louisiana, an unincorporated community
 Prairieville, Missouri, a ghost town
 Prairieville, Texas, an unincorporated community
 Prairieville, Wisconsin, former name of Waukesha
 Prairieville Township, Michigan
 Prairieville Township, Minnesota
 Prairieville Township, Pike County, Missouri